Heartland is a Canadian family comedy-drama television series which debuted in Canada on CBC on October 14, 2007.

The series is based on the Heartland book series by Lauren Brooke and follows Amy Fleming and her older sister Louise "Lou" Fleming on their Alberta-based family ranch, 'Heartland', where they live with their widowed grandfather Jack Bartlett, their father Tim Fleming and hired farmhand Ty Borden. While experiencing the highs and lows of life on the ranch, the family bonds and grows closer.

With the airing of its 139th episode on March 29, 2015, Heartland surpassed Street Legal as the longest-running one-hour scripted drama in Canadian television history.

On June 1, 2022, CBC renewed the series for Season 16 which consisted of 15 episodes and premiered on October 2, 2022 in Canada.

In the United States, the series has wide distribution through broadcast syndication on weekends, including as part of the default national schedule for Up TV and The CW Plus. Reruns of older episodes air on Hulu, Pluto TV, Crackle, Tubi, BYUtv, Retro TV, COZI TV, and Heartland (which is not named for the series). It was also a part of the schedule on the now-defunct Light TV until it was rebranded as TheGrio TV on January 15, 2021. The show is also available on Netflix and various other streaming platforms in the US.

Cast and characters

Main

 Amber Marshall as Amy Fleming

The protagonist of the series, Amy, practices natural horsemanship, the intuitive training and healing method used by her late mother, Marion. When Amy was fifteen, she was seriously injured in a car crash that killed Marion. They were living with Marion's father (Amy's grandfather), Jack, on his ranch, Heartland. While Amy recuperated, her estranged father, Tim, returned. Jack had banished Tim years earlier due to Tim's alcohol and drug use. Amy adjusts to her father re-entering her life, while older sister, Lou, who works in New York City, returns to Heartland after Marion's death. Jack begrudgingly accepts Tim, who tries to make amends for the past. Over time, Amy develops a close relationship with Ty Borden, a ranch hand working at Heartland as part of his probation. They fall in love, though the relationship is occasionally rocky. In the last episode of season 5, Ty plans to propose to Amy, but decides against it after overhearing her say she does not want to be tied down. They eventually marry, and, at the end of season 9, Amy is pregnant. At the end of Season 10, Amy gives birth to a girl, Lyndy Marion. In season 13, Amy and Ty become foster parents to Luke. Season 14 sees Amy dealing with Ty's accidental death and coping with being a single mother.

 Michelle Morgan as Samantha Louise "Lou" Fleming Morris

As the series opens, Lou returns home to help run Heartland, leaving behind her boyfriend and a lucrative business job in New York City. Upon discovering Heartland's poor financial situation, she crafts a financial plan to make the ranch profitable. After securing a bank loan, Lou takes over the business-end of Heartland, and later proposes creating the Heartland Equestrian Connection as a corporate retreat center. Family members derisively consider it as a "Dude Ranch". Lou rekindles a romance with local vet, Scott Cardinal. That relationship dissolves in season 2. She then meets Peter Morris, but their relationship is complicated by Peter's job in the oil industry. Lou and Peter marry at the end of season 3 and move to Dubai. Lou misses Heartland and her family and they move back. She gives birth to daughter Catherine Marion Minnie Fleming-Morris (“Katie”). Lou and Peter eventually buy Mr. Hanley's ranch. However, a fire demolishes the buildings and forces them to remain at Heartland. In Season 6, Lou and Peter adopt Georgina Crawley. In season 8, Peter's frequent long work absences stresses their marriage, and the couple separate. Lou is attracted to new stable hand, Mitch. Peter regularly visits his daughters, complicating Lou and Mitch's budding romance. In season 7, Lou buys Maggie's Diner and runs it with Tim, her supposedly "silent" business partner. Lou works on bringing Maggie's to New York City and spends much time commuting back and forth. Season 14 sees Lou become the Mayor of the town Hudson and the introduction of her side-kick and Chief Administrative Office Rick Adderly. Rick is the shows first openly gay character in the shows history and played by British actor Aidan Moreno.

 Shaun Johnston as Jackson "Jack" Bartlett

Jack, the family patriarch, was Marion's father and is Amy and Lou's grandfather. A former rodeo star, he owns Heartland. When Marion took over Heartland, it became a horse ranch. After her death, Jack helps Amy and Ty maintain Heartland and its horses and also repairs broken equipment, fences, and the like. Early in the series, he has a strained relationship with ex-son-in-law Tim, stemming from Tim's troubled past with alcohol and prescription drug abuse, his acrimonious divorce from Marion, and neglecting Amy and Lou when they were younger. Jack barely tolerate Tim at times, and they frequently argue over the running of the ranch. Jack was initially judgmental towards the new ranch hand, Ty, but gradually considers him like a son. Jack gives his blessing to Ty and Amy marrying. Jack's stubbornness and resistance to change sometimes causes friction between him and others, particularly with his romantic interest, Lisa Stillman, and granddaughter, Lou. Jack and Lisa elope in the season 7 finale. Jack suffers a heart attack and collapses in the field. Tim finds and saves him. Jack dotes on his three great-granddaughters, Katie, Georgie, and Lyndy.

 Chris Potter as Timothy "Tim" Fleming

Tim is Amy's and Lou's father who left the family after he and Marion separated (Lou was fourteen, and Amy was five). After a rodeo accident, he struggled with prescription drug (painkiller) abuse and alcoholism. As a result, Jack kicked Tim out. After Amy and Lou's mother dies, he returns, moving to Big River Ranch, near Heartland. Tim has a relationship with the previous owner's daughter, who inherited the ranch. He later dates a jockey named Janice and nearly moves to California with her. However, in Season 4 Episode 18 ("Burning Down the House"), it is discovered that Tim has an 11-year-old son named Shane with Miranda Grenier, his ex-girlfriend. When he reveals this to Janice, she leaves for California without him. Shane stays with Tim at Heartland for a short period. After a brief custody battle, Shane returns to live with his mother, who later remarries. Tim starts a rodeo school, a horse-selling business, and begins a new relationship. After moving on, he has a long-term relationship with Casey. His star rodeo pupils are Jade Virani and Clay McMurtry, teenage bronc riders.

Supporting
 Kerry James as Caleb O'Dell

Caleb is a ranch hand hired by Jack after Ty leaves for four months. In the beginning he is rather husky, has feelings for Amy, and develops a strong rivalry with Ty. He and Amy have a short-lived relationship, but Amy soon goes back to Ty. He falls in love with Ashley Stanton, eventually marrying her. Caleb is a rodeo cowboy. Before marrying Ashley, Caleb is severely injured at a rodeo. After battling prescription drugs and alcohol, much like Tim's, he recovers but is much thinner. Caleb and Ashley have a difficult marriage, struggling with financial problems, pressure from Val Stanton (Ashley's mother), and differing life goals. Caleb and Ashley eloped, but after discovering that their officiator's license had expired, they have a wedding outside Caleb's trailer (where they had been living). They honeymoon in Italy and stay with one of Val's friends, but Caleb returns alone. Ashley eventually returns and decides to pursue postsecondary education in Vancouver. Caleb moves there to be with Ashley, but they drift apart as she makes new friends and spends more time away from Caleb. They eventually divorce, and Caleb returns to Hudson and resumes working at Heartland, while seasonally competing at the rodeo. After Ashley, Caleb pursues Lou's friend Nicole (who had moved from New York and works for Lou at the ranch). He has a relationship with Cassandra, who was a vet student working at Scott's clinic. Caleb and Cass have a pregnancy scare. They almost break up, but marry at the end of Season 10. Ty and Amy were to attend, but Amy went into labour just as they arrived, and they had to rush home. Caleb and Cassandra discover they are expecting in Season 13 ('The Art of Trust'). Cassandra gives birth to their son, Carson, sometime between the Season 13 finale and the Season 14 premiere.

 Gabriel Hogan as Peter Walter Morris

Peter is Lou's ex-husband. He was first introduced as PW, the owner of a small oil company called Bedford Oil that is caught drilling on Heartland property. Lou organized a protest against PW's company. In the meantime, one of Lisa's horse friends gives out Lou's email without her permission. Lou (using her first name, Sam) and PW (using his first name, Peter) begin a relationship over an instant messaging service. After meeting, they are shocked to discover each other's identity. Their relationship is kept secret because both Jack and Tim hate PW for being part of "Big Oil." Peter eventually wins the family's approval and he and Lou are married in the Season 3 finale. Peter's business immediately takes them to Dubai. Lou returns home for a one-week visit that stretches on because she misses Heartland and her family. Peter commutes to and from Dubai because Lou is expecting their first child. Peter ends up bankrupt in Dubai, and asks to move in with Lou at Jack's house. Peter recovers financially, but is only home on weekends due to his new job's location in Vancouver. In Season 6, Lou and Peter adopt Georgie after Jack is not approved as her legal guardian. Lou and Peter separate because Peter is always away in Vancouver. Peter is discovered to have a girlfriend in Vancouver, which causes Lou to end the relationship. Peter continues visiting Heartland to see his daughters.

 Aidan Moreno as Rick Adderly

Chief Administrative Officer for the Mayors Office. Assistant to Lou Fleming (Michelle Morgan), Rick is the television shows first openly LGBTQ+ character in its history. 
 
 Jessica Steen as Lisa Stillman

Lisa is the charismatic owner of Fairfield Stables, and a well-known horse breeder. She is introduced when she comes to Amy for help with a horse in the first few episodes of the series. Jack and Lisa seem to have chemistry in that episode, and begin a romantic relationship a few episodes later. Lisa is often in the south of France seasonally for work, and her jet-setting lifestyle becomes a difficulty in her relationship with Jack. They remain together for several seasons until they break up in season 6, after he visits her in France, but does not enjoy himself, feeling out of place in the fancy places they visit. After a lengthy break, Lisa returns to Heartland and reunites with Jack. At the end of season 7, they elope but decide to continue living separately at the time, as they were more comfortable this way. In Season 11, it is revealed Lisa's business is floundering. She struggles to keep Fairfield running and all her staff employed, a fact she initially hides from Jack. She eventually admits her problems, and asks to move in with him at Heartland, to which he readily agrees. Lisa is also the godmother to Lou and Peter's daughter, Katie. Apocryphally, she is Georgie's godmother as well, a detail revealed only in Lou's 'Mom's the Word' blog, but has not been explicitly mentioned in-series.

 Baye McPherson as Katie Fleming Morris

Catherine "Katie" Marion Minnie Fleming Morris is Lou and Peter's only biological daughter, born in episode 67, "Passages." As an infant, the family took a large amount of time getting her to sleep through the night, and an episode featured this difficulty. Mallory is often brought in to babysit, since she's often at Heartland anyway, and interested in earning extra cash. In Season 7, Katie often cries at night for Lou, who is in the Atlantic provinces on a tour for her book, "Mom's the Word." Katie also starts bed-wetting, presumably for the same reason. As a result, Peter and Katie eventually join Lou on her book tour. Later in the series, Lou worries that Katie is not progressing as she should, taking her to see a pediatrician to check for abnormalities. This causes friction between Lou and Peter, as he believes that Katie is fine, which turns out to be the case. As of Season 10, Katie is a young, energetic girl who enjoys spending time with her family, especially her adoptive older sister Georgie and her great-grandfather. She has a favorite stuffed toy pony, called "Pogy." As a baby, Katie was played by twin sisters Keira and Jordan, and between Season 8 and Season 11, Katie was portrayed by Julia Maren Baker, who was replaced by Matheson in Season 12.  Yet another change took place at the beginning of season 15 when the character was taken over by Baye McPherson.

 Lucian-River Chauhan as Luke Kashani

Luke is a troubled foster kid that Clint brings to Heartland hoping Amy and Ty could help him. Over time and despite some difficulties, he becomes a part of the family. After his biological mother realizes she should not have custody of him, it is decided it is in the boy's best interest to remain at Heartland. In season 13 Amy and Ty become his foster parents.

 Ava Tran as Parker Yang

Parker is Jade Virani's step-sister who has moved to Hudson from Toronto.  She is an outspoken environmental activist who doesn't back down from her opinions.

 Ruby & Emmanuella Spencer as Lyndy Marion Borden

 Amy and Ty's daughter, born in Episode 175, "Greater Expectations". Her guardians (godparents), should anything happen to Amy and Ty, are Caleb and Cassandra.

Recurring

 Alisha Newton as Georgina "Georgie" Fleming Morris (Crawley)

Georgie is Lou and Peter's adopted daughter who was orphaned at age 3. After the foster care system separated her and her brother, Jeff, Georgie developed serious behavioral problems, though her behavior gradually improves. Georgie, a natural equestrian and a tomboy, is fearless, talented, strong-minded, and clever. This initially makes Mallory, a young family friend, jealous.  Georgie grows close to the family but occasionally misbehaves, even running away once. In later seasons, Georgie joins the Extreme Team, a trick riding group, replacing show jumping as Georgie's main equestrian activity.  She develops romantic feelings for Adam Parker, her tutor. Georgie and Adam briefly date but break up when Adam thinks she has feelings for Clay McMurtry. By seasons 14 and 15, she is in a relationship with newcomer Quinn. He encourages Georgie to revive her dream of competing in the Olympics. She begins training at his family's Florida ranch. Although billed as "main cast" during this time, Georgie later becomes more of a "recurring character" due to her infrequent visits back to Heartland. She was absent for all of season 15 and much of 16 after Newton left the main cast for nearly two seasons to pursue other acting opportunities. She returned for the last two episodes of season 16. Early on in season 16, Georgie gets into a riding accident during one of the competitions off screen that lead her to be nearly paralyzed. She returned to the ranch on screen at the end of season 16, after her character made a physical recovery to deal with the trauma of her accident.

 Nathaniel Arcand as Scott Cardinal

A close Native Canadian friend of the Bartlett/Fleming household and also Heartland's vet. Scott had a troubled background, but Marion helped him to turn his life around, Scott and Lou have a relationship for part of seasons 1 and 2. He later regrets losing her and for not try harder to win her back. In season 2, Ty tells Amy that Scott has agreed to let Ty be his apprentice and that Scott will mentor him to possibly work with him after veterinary school. Ty eventually attends veterinary school at the University of Calgary, and works part-time at Scott's clinic in later seasons. He is also joined by Cassandra, another U of C vet student who is a year or two ahead of Ty. Scott later offers Ty to be his partner in the clinic.
 
 Laara Sadiq as Dr. Tricia Virani.

 She is Jade's mother. Although she arrived in Heartland as a tourist, Lou soon requested her help to tend to Jack, in exchange for riding lessons. While Tim offers to be an instructor, they eventually end up having a brief love affair.

 Kevin McGarry as Mitch Cutty

 Mitch is hired as a ranch hand at Heartland and works hard to earn the family's respect, especially with Jack and Tim. After much hostility, Tim nicknames Mitch "Trooper" after a tenacious but respectable bronc on the circuit. Following an awkward first "date," Mitch and Lou enter into an off-and-on relationship. Mitch is troubled by guilt due to the loss of his cousin to PTSD but confides in Lou and they earn each other's trust. Following a breakup with Lou, Mitch begins dating "new age" yoga instructor Maya which forces Lou to confront her true feelings for him.
 Roger LeBlanc as Bob Grainger
 Bob runs a wildlife reserve.

 Kataem O'Connor as Adam Parker

 Adam is Georgie's math tutor and becomes her first serious boyfriend.

 Helen Colliander as Olivia Wheaton

 Olivia is Georgie's rival throughout the series but later becomes her friend.

 Madison Cheeatow as Jade Virani

 Jade is Georgie's friend and Dr. Virani's daughter. She is a bronc rider and lives in Caleb's old trailer for a time to assert her independence. Tim is doubtful of Jade at first but grows to respect her tenacity and talent.

 Kaitlyn Leeb as Cassandra Odell

 Introduced as one of Ty's classmates at veterinarian school, Cassandra ends up working at the vet clinic with Ty. She initially appears to be an ambitious and arrogant know-it-all, which makes Amy uncomfortable. She is romantically involved with Jeremy Hughes until he sabotages Heartland, after which she is fired from the vet clinic and forced to take a job at the dude ranch, to which she is ill-suited. Scott convinces a reluctant Ty to give Cass another chance at their understaffed clinic, where she eventually becomes a good friend to Amy and Ty. She and Caleb wind up in a long-term relationship and are married in the final episode of season 10. And in season 13 episode 7 Cassandra tells Caleb that she's pregnant with their first child. Between Seasons 13 and 14, Cassandra gives birth to her son, Carson.

 Greta Onieogou as Soraya Duval

 Amy's best friend who works at Maggie's, her mom's diner. Soraya always supports Amy and becomes friends with Ashley around the same time as Amy. She later visits London, England and meets a new boyfriend. In Season 5, Soraya moves to London permanently. She briefly returns at the end of season 8 to attend Amy and Ty's wedding at the Heartland Ranch.

 Wanda Cannon as Valerie "Val" Stanton

 Ashley and Jesse's widowed mother, and the main antagonist throughout much of the series. Val is the proud owner of Briar Ridge Stables and uses more traditional methods of horse training compared to Heartland. Val puts too much pressure on Ashley to win horse shows, but loves and spoils her daughter. She is also friends with Jack, particularly when Jack helps her to work on her relationship with her daughter, after Ashley becomes more independent and rebellious. 

 Anna Ferguson as Mrs. Sally Bell

 A long-time family friend of the Fleming/Bartlett family who owns Sugarfoot, a cute Shetland pony whom Lou learned to ride on. Mrs. Bell keeps Sugarfoot in her house as a companion, and prefers using her herbal remedies on him rather than having him cared for by Scott or the farrier. Mrs. Bell made Marion's and Amy's wedding dresses. Her last appearance to date was Amy and Ty's wedding.

Michelle Nolden as Jessica Cook
Jessica is Lou's former Strickland & Cook boss from New York. She comes to Hudson to meet with Lou to apologize for firing her back in Season 1. Lou had formerly been deeply resentful of the firing, believing Jessica to be cutthroat and brutal in her business life. Jessica, however, reveals she recently went through a bout with cancer. As a result, she turned over a new leaf, quit the firm, and decided to travel and indulge in her hobbies, one of which is photography. Her stay in Hudson goes longer than anticipated, leading to sparks flying between her and Tim.

Guest or former cast

Main
 Jessica Amlee as Mallory Wells Anderson

 A friend of the family who visited frequently and often stayed overnight, Mallory is the daughter of a Canadian country music artist (real-life Canadian country music artist George Canyon), whose music she finds annoying, and is hired by Lou to babysit Katie on a regular basis. She was mostly known for talking too much and prying into everyone's personal lives, which often got her into trouble. Mallory rides the horses at Heartland and participates in jumping competitions. She is easily infatuated with boys, and has a crush on Ty early in the series, though her main love interests wind up being Jake Anderson and Badger. Mallory leaves Heartland several times, most significantly to attend an all-girls boarding school to which she is sent by her parents when her father goes on tour the first time. Jake helps her buy a bus ticket and return to Heartland. At the end of Season 5, she announced with dismay that she was moving to Nashville for her father's music career, though she and her family returned to Canada in season 6. In season 7, she finally confessed her feelings for Jake and went with him to Paris. In season 10, episode 14, Mallory came back to Heartland and married him.

 Cindy Busby as Ashley Stanton

 In season 1, she fulfilled the archetype of the high-school mean girl, but after Amy helps Ashley improve her show-jumping and later saves her horse Apollo, Ashley warms up to Amy and her best friend Soraya. Ashley's character develops substantially from this point, and she is shown to struggle in her relationship with her mother. As a result, she lives at Heartland for a short period of time and later stays with Caleb, in his rented trailer. Ashley gradually falls for Caleb in Season 2 and starts a serious relationship with him, and they marry in the season 3 finale. It took Ashley a while to come back from their honeymoon in Italy, resulting in Caleb coming home alone. Later in the series, Ashley and Caleb moved away so she could attend college. Caleb returned alone again, and they eventually got a divorce. In season 7, episode nine, she comes back to see her friends. She's now becoming a lawyer.

 Graham Wardle as Tyler "Ty" Borden

 When Ty was a child, he was abused by his stepfather Wade, whom he attacked for assaulting Ty's mother. The incident resulted in Ty's arrest and being sent to juvenile hall; to complete his probation, Marion Fleming offered him a job as a ranch hand at Heartland. He soon begins to enjoy his life there and decides to stay after completing his probation, though he leaves for a short period to live with his biological father in Calgary. Jack treats Ty like a son and is very proud of him, especially after he earns his high school diploma and decides to study to become a vet. Ty at first is known as the "new cute guy" by Amy's friends, and Amy quickly falls for him. Ty dated Kit Bailey, a local cowgirl, for a time before he admitted his feelings for Amy. He and Amy have a tumultuous relationship over the subsequent seasons. In the final episode of Season 5, Ty buys a ring with plans to propose to Amy, but rethinks his proposal after hearing Amy say they should never "tie themselves down." When Amy discovers the ring, Ty and Amy agree to wait, and Ty is accepted to vet school and begins assisting Scott at his clinic. While camping, Ty finds the perfect moment to propose to Amy, who accepts, and they later marry. After Amy tells Ty that he is going to become a father, she supports his decision to go to Mongolia to save the last of the Gobi bears with Veterinarians Without Borders. Near the end of the season 10, Ty contracts a potentially life-threatening illness from a tick bite and returns to Calgary in critical condition. He is immediately taken to the hospital, where they help him to slowly recover. At the end of the season, Caleb breaks Ty out of the hospital so that Ty can participate in Caleb's wedding to Cass as the best man. However, Amy goes into labor as they arrive at the church and they rush home for the birth of their daughter. In season 13 Amy and Ty become foster parents to a young boy named Luke. In the first episode of season 14 Ty suddenly collapses and dies from deep vein thrombosis, a complication arising after being shot at the end of Season 13.

 Victoria Pratt as Casey McMurtry

 Casey, formerly a pro barrel racer, was in a relationship with Tim when she returns to Hudson after the death of her husband, Hank "The Tank" McMurtry. She convinced Tim to start a rodeo school. She is sister-in-law to Jen, Lou's current Dude Ranch and Maggie's Diner manager, and aunt to Wyatt and Brick. Following Tim's brain cancer scare, Tim pushes Casey away, eventually leading to a permanent break-up. 

 Suzanne Coy as Margaret "Maggie" Duval

 Soraya's smart aleck mother and Marion's best friend who was the original owner of the tack and feed store Maggie's Diner. Maggie leaves in early Season 7 to live in London, England to be near Soraya.
 Keegan Connor Tracy as Crystal

 Georgie's biological aunt who has intentions that are not initially seen. After Georgie breaks her arm, Crystal visits Heartland and files child abuse claims against Lou and Peter to extort money from them in exchange for dropping the charges. Georgie and the social worker overhear this and Crystal leaves empty handed and facing a possible arrest.
 Ben Cardinal as Victor Whitetail

Marion's good friend who fixes horses and people. Victor enjoys golf and once had an affair with Marion after Tim left her. Victor's horse style is different from Amy's, and he helps her a couple times during the series.
 Torrance Coombs as Chase Powers

 Amy's rival in "The Ring of Fire." Following a clinic they did together, he kisses her. Later, Ty confronts him about it and hits him twice, once for running Mrs. Bell off the road and once for kissing Amy. While getting ice for the bruises, Chase and Soraya become friends. He is later invited to Amy and Soraya's graduation party as Soraya's date. There he kisses Soraya and they begin dating. In "Leap of Faith," he asks Amy to come along with him and Soraya to a movie. He tells Amy when she arrives that Soraya had to study. After the movie it is shown that he still likes Amy. During "The River," Soraya ends the relationship.
 Raoul Trujillo as Renard

 Amy's new friend who runs "Dark Horse," a popular traveling horse show. 
 Emma Lahana as Blair Conner

 A friend of Ty's, who spent time with him working at a ranch in Montana. She came with him to Heartland when he returned to Amy in season 4. She was the source of considerable friction between Amy and Ty, when she pursued Ty during her first appearance, and later when she told her boyfriend, Grant, that she and Ty had "hooked up."
 Beau Mirchoff as Benjamin "Ben" Stillman

 Lisa's arrogant nephew. Ben competes in show jumping competitions with his horse Red. He worked at Heartland for part of a season, but then he goes to work for Nick Harwell. He later fires Nick Harwell and goes back to his aunt's stables. Later in season 2, he leaves Briar Ridge and attends a university.
Stephen Amell as Nicholas "Nick" Harwell

 A champion rider. Amy helps Nick's horse in "Born to Run."

Episodes

Filming locations
Much of the series is filmed on location in and around High River, Alberta, with additional filming in studio and on location in nearby Calgary. A June 2013 flood in High River swamped the standing set for Maggie's Diner. The main Heartland sets escaped damage, and seventh season scripts were rewritten to move shooting locations for the fictional town of Hudson to Inglewood, a historic neighborhood in downtown Calgary. A month after the flood, the show's Calgary studios offered behind-the-scenes tours to paying fans for a one-day "Heartlanders for High River" fundraiser, providing $80,000 to help the town recover.

Heartland filmed some of its interiors at an abandoned military base, Currie Barracks,
scheduled for redevelopment.

Home media
Entertainment One has released the first seven seasons of Heartland on DVD in Region 1 (Canada only). The standalone TV movie A Heartland Christmas was released on DVD in Canada on November 1, 2011 and in the United States on October 29, 2013. Season 8 was released in Canada on October 6, 2015.

In Region 2, 4Digital Media has released the first 6 seasons on DVD in the UK.

In Region 4, Season 1 and Season 2 Parts 1 and 2 have been released by Roadshow Home Video.

Ratings

In its series premiere, Heartland beat Global's comedy Da Kink in My Hair with 513,000 viewers in a battle of two new series. After four episodes, Heartland had an average viewership of 464,000. In its first-season finale, Heartland attracted 625,000 viewers. The third-season premiere brought in over one million viewers, a new record for the show. The 100th episode "After All We've Been Through" was watched by 945,000 viewers.

Spin-off web series
A six-part spin-off web series titled Hudson with Jade Verani as the protagonist was released on CBC Gem on March 31, 2019. It won the Best Web Series award at the Calgary Society of Independent Filmmakers's second annual Stinger Awards.

References

External links

 
 
 Heartland at UP TV Network
 Heartland at epguides.com

2007 Canadian television series debuts
2000s Canadian drama television series
2010s Canadian drama television series
2020s Canadian drama television series
Canadian comedy-drama television series
CBC Television original programming
English-language television shows
High River
Television shows filmed in Alberta
Television shows set in Alberta
Television series about horses
Television shows based on British novels
Television series by Entertainment One
Television series about families
Television series about orphans